Victor Yu, sometimes transliterated Victor Te-Sun Yu, was ambassador of the Republic of China (Taiwan) to Solomon Islands until January 2017. He was succeeded by Roger Tian-hung Luo.

References

Ambassadors of the Republic of China to the Solomon Islands